Esther Margareta Vilar (born Esther Margareta Katzen, September 16, 1935) is an Argentine-German writer. She trained and practised as a medical doctor before establishing herself as an author. She is best known for her 1971 book The Manipulated Man and its various follow-ups, which argue that, contrary to common feminist and women's rights rhetoric, women in industrialized cultures are not oppressed, but rather exploit a well-established system of manipulating men.

Biography
Vilar's parents were German emigrants. They separated when she was three years old.

She studied medicine at the University of Buenos Aires, and in 1960 went to West Germany on scholarship to continue her studies in psychology and sociology. She worked as a doctor in a Bavarian hospital for a year, and has also worked as a translator, saleswoman, assembly-line worker in a thermometer factory, shoe model, and secretary.

Esther married the German author Klaus Wagn in 1961.  The marriage ended in divorce but they had a son, Martin, in 1964.  Concerning the divorce she stated, "I didn't break up with the man, just with marriage as an institution."

Work

The Manipulated Man (1971)

One of Vilar's most popular books is titled The Manipulated Man, which she called part of a study on "man's delight in nonfreedom". In it, she claims that women are not oppressed by men, but rather control men in a relationship that is to their advantage but which most men are not aware of.

Some of the strategies described in her book are:

 Luring men with sex, which she referred to as the "periodic use of a woman's vagina," and other seduction strategies
 Controlling men by the judicious use of praise, sex, and emotional blackmail once they have been lured
 Masking her real intentions and motives in the guise of romantic love

The Manipulated Man was quite popular at the time of its release, in part due to the considerable press coverage it received.

Vilar appeared on The Tonight Show on February 21, 1973, to discuss the book. In 1975 she was invited to a televised debate by WDR with Alice Schwarzer, who became known as the representative of the women's movement at that time. The debate was controversial, with Schwarzer claiming Vilar was: "Not only sexist, but fascist", comparing her book with the Nazi newspaper Der Stürmer.

According to the author, she received death threats over the book:
So I hadn't imagined broadly enough the isolation I would find myself in after writing this book. Nor had I envisaged the consequences which it would have for subsequent writing and even for my private life - violent threats have not ceased to this date.

Other books
Her play Speer (1998) is a work of fictional biography about the German architect, Albert Speer, and has been staged in Berlin and London, directed by and starring Klaus Maria Brandauer. She has also written many other books and plays, but most have not been translated into English.

Selected works
 
 
 Book collecting original series of 3: Der dressierte Mann [The Manipulated Man], Das polygame Geschlecht [The polygamous sex], Das Ende der Dressur (The End of the Manipulation; third part never translated into English). dtv Verlag 1998.

See also 
 Antifeminism
 Hypergamy
 Men's movement
 Men Going Their Own Way

References

External links

 
 Pinter & Martin, English publishers
 2021 article titled "Women are spoiled - even today", interviewing Esther (in german)

1935 births
Living people
Argentine women writers
Argentine Jews
Jewish Argentine writers
Jewish dramatists and playwrights
Jewish women writers
Argentine people of German-Jewish descent
Argentine dramatists and playwrights
20th-century Argentine writers
20th-century dramatists and playwrights
20th-century German writers
20th-century German women writers
Female critics of feminism
Women dramatists and playwrights
Writers from Buenos Aires
University of Buenos Aires alumni
20th-century German physicians